The 2019 Sun Belt Conference football season was the 18th season of college football play for the Sun Belt Conference. It was played from August 29, 2019 until January 2020. The Sun Belt Conference consists of 10 members in two divisions. It was part of the 2019 NCAA Division I FBS football season.

Previous season
In The 2018 season The Appalachian State Mountaineers finished the season with a 7–1 Conference Record and the Louisiana Rajun Cajuns finished the season with a 5–3 Conference Record met in the first ever Sun Belt Conference Championship Game held at Kidd Brewer Stadium With Appalachian State defeating the Louisiana Rajun Cajuns 30–19

Preseason

Recruiting classes

Sun Belt Media Days
Preseason Media polls

The 2019 preseason coaches football poll was released on July 19, voted from the 10 coaches of the conference. Appalachian State and Louisiana were chosen to be the finalist for their division, with the Mountaineers predicted to win the Sun Belt Championship Game.
East Division
1. Appalachian State (7) – 46 pts
2. Troy (1) – 39 pts
3. Georgia Southern (2) – 35 pts
4. Coastal Carolina – 17 pts
5. Georgia State – 13 pts
West Division
1. Louisiana (6) – 46 pts
2. Arkansas State (3) – 42 pts
3. ULM – 27 pts
4. South Alabama (1) – 19 pts
5. Texas State – 16 pts

Preseason awards
Preseason All-Sun Belt

Offensive Player of the Year: B.J. Smith (Troy, Senior)
Defensive Player of the Year: Kindle Vildor (Georgia Southern, Senior)

Ref:

Head coaches

Coaches

Rankings

Schedules

Regular season
The regular season will begin on August 29, 2019, and will end on November 30, 2019.

Week One

Week Two

Week Three

Week Four

Week Five

Week Six

Week Seven

Week Eight

Week Nine

Week Ten

Week Eleven

Week Twelve

Week Thirteen

Week Fourteen

Championship Game

Week Fifteen (Sun Belt Championship Game)

Sun Belt records vs Other Conferences
2019–2020 records against non-conference foes:

Regular Season

Post Season

Sun Belt vs Power Five matchups
This is a list of games the Sun Belt has scheduled versus power conference teams (ACC, Big 10, Big 12, Pac-12, BYU/Notre Dame and SEC). All rankings are from the current AP Poll at the time of the game.

Sun Belt vs Group of Five matchups
The following games include Sun Belt teams competing against teams from the American, C-USA, MAC or Mountain West.

Sun Belt vs FBS independents matchups
The following games include Sun Belt teams competing against FBS Independents, which includes Army, Liberty, New Mexico State, or UMass.

Sun Belt vs FCS matchups

Postseason

Bowl games

Rankings are from CFP rankings.  All times Mountain Time Zone.  Sun Belt teams shown in bold.

Selection of teams
Bowl eligible:  Appalachian State, Arkansas State, Georgia Southern, Georgia State, Louisiana
Bowl-ineligible: Coastal Carolina, Louisiana–Monroe, South Alabama, Texas State, Troy

Awards and honors

Player of the week honors

Sun Belt Individual Awards
The following individuals received postseason honors as voted by the Sun Belt Conference football coaches at the end of the season

All-conference teams

*Denotes Unanimous Selection

Ref:

All Conference Honorable Mentions: Noel Cook, Appalachian State (Sr., LB, Reidsville, N.C.)
Ryan Neuzil, Appalachian State (Jr., OL, Bradenton, Fla.)
Marcus Williams Jr., Appalachian State (Jr., RB, Rocky Mount, N.C.)
Malik Williams, Appalachian State (Jr., WR, Chester, S.C.)
Caleb Bonner, Arkansas State (Jr., LB, Reform, Ala.)
Andre Harris Jr., Arkansas State (So., OL, Oklahoma City, Okla.)
Marcel Murray, Arkansas State (So., RB, Hiram, Ga.)
Ivory Scott, Arkansas State (Jr., OL, Kenner, La.)
Shadell Bell, Coastal Carolina (RSr., TE, Decatur, Ga.)
Jaivon Heiligh, Coastal Carolina (So., WR, Venice, Fla.)
Ethan Howard, Coastal Carolina (RSr., OL, Brookwood, Ala.)
CJ Marable, Coastal Carolina (Jr., RB, Decatur, Ga.)
Shai Werts, Georgia Southern (RJr., QB, Clinton, S.C.)
Wesley Kennedy III, Georgia Southern (Jr., RB, Savannah, Ga.)
J.D. King, Georgia Southern (Jr., RB, Fitzgerald, Ga.)
Reynard Ellis, Georgia Southern (RSo., LB, Birmingham, Ala.)
Roger Carter, Georgia State (Jr., TE, Columbia, S.C.)
Malik Sumter, Georgia State (RSo., C, Irmo, S.C.)
Hardrick Willis, Georgia State (RSo., DE, Jonesboro, Ga.)
Dontae Wilson, Georgia State (Jr., NG, Jefferson, Ga.)
Jacques Boudreaux, Louisiana (Sr., LB, New Orleans, La.)
Jarrod Jackson, Louisiana (RSr., WR, Reserve, La.)
Chauncey Manac, Louisiana (RJr., LB, Homerville, Ga.)
Nick Ralston, Louisiana (Gr., TE, Argyle, Texas)
Caleb Evans, ULM (Sr., QB, Mansfield, Texas)
Markis McCray, ULM (RSr., WR, Euless, Texas)
Larance Shaw, ULM (Sr., DL, Fort Worth, Texas)
Eastwood Thomas, ULM (RSr., OL, Jackson, Ala.)
Kawaan Baker, South Alabama (Jr., WR, Atlanta, Ga.)
Sean Brown, South Alabama (Sr., DL, Pleasant Grove, Ala.)
Riley Cole, South Alabama (Jr., LB, Oneonta, Ala.)
Jacob Shoemaker, South Alabama (Jr., OL, Gulfport, Miss.)
Jarron Morris, Texas State (So., CB, Orange, Texas)
Caeveon Patton, Texas State (Jr., DT, Cuero, Texas)
Hutch White, Texas State (Sr., WR, Kerrville, Texas)
Khambrail Winters, Texas State (Fr., CB, Houston, Texas)
Dylan Bradshaw, Troy (Jr., OL, Enterprise, Ala.)
Khalil McClain, Troy (Jr., WR, Fairburn, Ga.)
Dell Pettus, Troy (Fr., DB, Harvest, Ala.)
Austin Stidham, Troy (RSo., OL, Russellville, Ala.)

All-Americans

The 2019 College Football All-America Teams are composed of the following College Football All-American first teams chosen by the following selector organizations: Associated Press (AP), Football Writers Association of America (FWAA), American Football Coaches Association (AFCA), Walter Camp Foundation (WCFF), The Sporting News (TSN), Sports Illustrated (SI), USA Today (USAT) ESPN, CBS Sports (CBS), FOX Sports (FOX) College Football News (CFN), Bleacher Report (BR), Scout.com, Phil Steele (PS), SB Nation (SB), Athlon Sports, Pro Football Focus (PFF) and Yahoo! Sports (Yahoo!).

Currently, the NCAA compiles consensus all-America teams in the sports of Division I-FBS football and Division I men's basketball using a point system computed from All-America teams named by coaches associations or media sources.  The system consists of three points for a first-team honor, two points for second-team honor, and one point for third-team honor.  Honorable mention and fourth team or lower recognitions are not accorded any points.  Football consensus teams are compiled by position and the player accumulating the most points at each position is named first team consensus all-American.  Currently, the NCAA recognizes All-Americans selected by the AP, AFCA, FWAA, TSN, and the WCFF to determine Consensus and Unanimous All-Americans. Any player named to the First Team by all five of the NCAA-recognized selectors is deemed a Unanimous All-American.

*AFCA All-America Team
*AP All-America teams
*CBS Sports All-America Team
*ESPN All-America Team
*FWAA All-America Team
*Sports Illustrated All-America Team
*The Athletic All-America Team
*USA Today All-America Team
*Walter Camp All-America Team
*Sporting News All-America Team

All-Academic

National award winners
2019 College Football Award Winners

Home Game Attendance

Bold – Exceed capacity
†Season High

NFL Draft

The following list includes all Sun Belt players who were drafted in the 2020 NFL draft.

References